The N&W LC-2 was a class of boxcab electric locomotives built by Westinghouse and the American Locomotive Company (ALCO) for the Norfolk and Western Railway. ALCO and Westinghouse built four locomotives in 1924–1925 for use on the Elkhorn Grade. They were retired and scrapped in 1950 when the N&W discontinued electric operations.

Design 
The LC-2 was an improved version of the N&W LC-1, which Westinghouse, with Baldwin, had built for the N&W in 1914–1915. The locomotives were a third more powerful than their predecessors.

History 
Westinghouse and ALCO delivered four LC-2s in 1924–1925, which the N&W operated alongside the older LC-1s. Following World War II the N&W bypassed the existing Elkhorn Tunnel with a new tunnel twice as long as the original, double-tracked, and on a gentler 1.4% grade. These improvements eliminated the need for electrification. On the opening of the new tunnel on June 26, 1950 the N&W retired the LC-2s.

Notes

References 
 

11 kV AC locomotives
1-D-1 locomotives
ALCO locomotives
Electric locomotives of the United States
LC2
Scrapped locomotives
Standard gauge locomotives of the United States
Westinghouse locomotives